This Is Desolation is the second full-length studio album recorded by Shell Beach. It was released in November, 2012.

Recording and production
The band worked on this 11-song record for the past two years. The album has 11 tracks and includes Matt Geise of Lower Definition (Ferret) / Dance Gavin Dance (Rise Records) and Zeek as special guest vocalists in two of the songs, with Tamás Somló (Lokomotiv GT) playing the clarinet on track #9. The second record further helped Shell Beach get established as the most prominent band of the Hungarian and Budapest post-hardcore scenes. The album was recorded in Pannonia Studios and mixed and mastered by Dávid Schram.

Music videos
Vital Signs, the first music video for the album was released in November, 2012. The video has been selected and placed in rotation on MTV Hungary and VIVA Hungary.

Track listing
"Hoverboards Don`t Work On Water"
"The Greatest Skeptic"
"Vital Signs"
"This Arm, These Vessels"
"Saviour"
"Hirudinean"
"Bjornoya"
"Black Xross"
"Sit Down, Navigator"
"Ghoat Node"
"The Sleep Paralysis (ft. Zeek)"

Personnel
The following people contributed to This Is Desolation:

Shell Beach
Zoltán Totik – vocals
Pál Somló – guitars, background-vocals
Viktor Sági – guitars
Mátyás Mohácsi – bass
Dániel Ivánfi – drums

Additional musicians and production
 Tamás Somló - clarinet (9)
Matt Geise - vocals (1)
MC Zeek - vocals (11)
 Dávid Schram - production, mixing and mastering

References

External links
 This Is Desolation at Redfield Records webpage

2012 albums
Shell Beach (band) albums